Tom Stone is a crime drama series that ran in Canada on CBC Television for two 13-episode seasons beginning on March 25, 2002.  In the United States, the series is syndicated by PPI Releasing and Sony Pictures Television under the title Stone Undercover.

Overview
The hour-long series, which is set on location in Calgary and surrounding Alberta locations, stars Chris William Martin in the title role, a roguish character with a colorful past: He was a cop, an oil rigger and an ex-con. His background provides the perfect ingredients the Royal Canadian Mounted Police need to help them in solving cases that require an outsider.

Assisting him in these assignments is RCMP Corporal Marina Di Luzio (Janet Kidder), a female by-the-book type commercial crime specialist who has an on again-off again friction with the unconventional Stone, which also carries over into the cases they're assigned to. In addition, there is also Tom's American scotch-and-cigar smoking buddy, Jack Welsh (Stuart Margolin). Canadian actor Art Hindle also had a recurring role as Neil McQuinn, a shady but well connected businessman.

The series was commonly compared by television critics to a Canadian version of The Rockford Files. Series creator Andrew Wreggitt openly acknowledged that he was influenced by that show, as well as Northern Exposure and North of 60.

References

External links

 Official website
 

CBC Television original programming
2000s Canadian crime drama television series
Stone, Tom
Television series by Sony Pictures Television
2002 Canadian television series debuts
2004 Canadian television series endings
Television shows set in Calgary
Television shows filmed in Calgary